Corrinne Yu is an American game programmer. She worked on games including King's Quest, Quake 2, and Halo 4. Her engine work included Unreal Engine 3, Microsoft's Direct 3D Advisory Board, and CUDA and GPU simulation at NVidia. She has also designed accelerator experiments for nuclear physics research.

Biography

Early life
Yu attended California State Polytechnic University, Pomona to study electrical engineering before beginning her career as a professional programmer.

Game development
Yu's early career was as a programmer for the King's Quest series for the Apple II, although she had her own 3D engine projects that she sold to various companies. She programmed for QuickDraw 3D, an early rasterisation API. She worked on the game Zombie, and created the video game engine used in Spec Ops: Rangers Lead The Way. In November 1997, she was employed by video game developer Ion Storm. She worked on the 2001 video game Anachronox and served as Director of Technology at the studio. While at Ion she was responsible for the Quake 2 code base used in their games and any games based on that engine. In November 1998, she left Ion Storm and later became the Lead Technology Programmer at 3D Realms. Yu worked as an engine programmer at Gearbox Software, creator of Brothers in Arms and Borderlands. Yu worked to heavily modify the Epic Unreal Engine 3 with an emphasis on lighting, shadows and physics. Yu was a founding member of Microsoft's Direct 3D Advisory Board. She participated in CUDA and GPU simulation at NVidia.

In 2008, Microsoft Studios hired Yu as the Principal Engine Architect for an internal studio, 343 Industries. 343 Industries was established in 2007 to oversee the Halo franchise following Bungie's separation from Microsoft. Yu programmed lighting, facial animation, and developed new technology for the 2012 video game Halo 4. While coding on Halo team, Yu researched new lighting techniques, and invented new dynamic radiosity algorithms. Microsoft applied a software patent for Yu's Halo lighting work.

In November 2013, Yu joined video game developer Naughty Dog, a subsidiary of Sony Computer Entertainment, to work as a graphic programmer on unannounced PlayStation 4 projects. In November 2014, she left Naughty Dog and joined Amazon.com to work on their Amazon Prime Air program. In March 2018, she left Amazon and joined General Motors as a VP of Engineering.

Other works and awards
Besides working as a game programmer, Yu programmed on the Space Shuttle program at Rockwell International California. She designed and conducted accelerator experiments at LINAC in California and the accelerator at Brookhaven National Laboratory. Her nuclear physics research won her a national award from the U.S. Department of Energy. In 2009, Corrinne Yu won Best in Engineering internationally at GDC (Game Developers Conference) WiG nominated and judged by a panel of her industry peers for the last 2 years in a row, for her work in programming. In 2010, Yu was identified by Kotaku as one of the 10 most influential women in games in the last decade. She is the only director of technology, and the only engine programmer, on this list.

Personal life
Yu is married to Kenneth Scott, formerly Senior Art Director at 343 Industries. Together they have a daughter named Chloe Scott-Yu.

Development style and influences
Yu is driven by her interest in how complex pieces can be made to fit together, and compared every day to playing a game of Minecraft, only more flexible and with greater real world applicability.

Work

 Halo 4 (2012) Graphics Engineering 
 Brothers in Arms: Hell's Highway (2008) Programming
 Anachronox (2001) Programming
 Spec Ops: Rangers Lead the Way (1998) Programming

References

External links 

 
 

Living people
Year of birth missing (living people)
American computer programmers
American people of Hong Kong descent
American video game programmers
American women computer scientists
Women video game programmers
California State Polytechnic University, Pomona alumni
American computer scientists
Naughty Dog people
21st-century American women